Nice Nailantei Leng'ete is a Kenyan human rights activist, advocating for alternative rite of passage (ARP) for girls in Africa and campaigning to stop female genital mutilation (FGM). In her work with Amref Health Africa,  Leng'ete has saved an estimated 15,000 girls from undergoing genital mutilation and for many, childhood marriages. She was named by Time Magazine in 2018 as one of the 100 most influential people in the world.

Early life and education
Nice Nailantei Leng'ete was born in 1991 in the village of Kimana in Maasai country in Kenya. She was orphaned when both her parents died in 1997 and 1998. She spent her early years moving among many different homes in her village. When she was eight years old, she was sent away to a boarding school. It was at boarding school that Leng'ete discovered that "the cut",  a rite of passage for girls transitioning to womanhood in her Maasai culture, was not required. 

At the age of eight, when her time came to undergo "the cut", Leng'ete decided to run away, encouraging her sister to come with her. They ran through the bush to their aunt's house —70 kilometers away, to avoid being seen on the road. Leng'ete's uncle and men from the village soon discovered where she and her sister were hiding. When they came for the girls, they beat and threatened them. The next year, when village girls were being prepared for the rite of passage, Leng'ete' ran away again, but was unable to persuade her sister to join her.

When she was brought back to the village, Leng'ete made an appeal to her grandfather. She told him that she would run away forever and live on the streets rather than endure being "cut". Her grandfather relented, and agreed to let her to forego the traditional ritual, and also allowed her to return to school. Leng'ete was ostracized by the village as being a bad example and someone who shamed her family and community.

Early activism
Leng’ete was the first girl in her village to go to high school, She began to be seen in her village as an inspiration to young girls and women.  Later, Leng'ete would hide young girls who asked for her help in avoiding "being cut", an action which made her an outcast in her community. Leng'ete continued to advocate for the girls and encouraged the villagers to discuss the sensitive and important issue.

In the Maasai culture,  women are not allowed to address village elders, but when Leng’ete attended a sexual health class sponsored by Amref Health Africa, she asked the village leaders to let her share with the community what she had learned. The village elders allowed her to speak only to the younger men of the village, but none of the men were interested in listening to her. “No girl had been courageous enough before to challenge the status quo, to challenge men,” according to Douglas Meritei, one of those men. Len'ete would not give up, she kept trying to speak to the younger men for the next two years. Eventually, the elders of the village told the young men to sit with her, but only three of those men would speak to her.
"Gradually, more of the younger men came to talk with her, she said, and gradually the topics expanded — from H.I.V. prevention to teenage pregnancy and its health complications, to early marriage, to school attrition and, finally, to the cut."

After nearly four years of conversations, the village elders decided to abandon cutting. "She had persuaded the men, and with them the village, that everyone would be healthier and wealthier if girls stayed in school, married later and gave birth without the complications cutting can create". Because of her advocacy, Leng'ete was the first woman in her village to be given the Black Walking Stick, which signifies leadership, respect and power within her community.

Activism career
In 2013, Leng'ete spoke at the Clinton Global Initiative (CGI) in New York about her campaign to stop FGM . She also gave a TEDx Talk in the Netherlands on sexual and reproductive health rights. 

In 2014, the Maasai elders, who rule over 1.5 million people — declared the end of the practice of FGM. Because of Leng'ete's work, girls become women in the Maasai community without undergoing FGM, continue their education, instead of marrying early and bearing children when most are still children themselves. Since 2014, Leng'ete has been working as a project officer under the Amref Health Africa in Kenya Alternative Rite of Passage project (ARP). She manages an advocacy program that travels from village to village to convince elders and community leaders to allow other young girls to forgo "the cut" and go to school. "Leng'ete's work as a project officer with Amref Health Africa has saved an estimated 15,000 girls from FGM, as well as from childhood marriage."

Leng’ete continues work with  Amref Health Africa to educate young people about sexual and reproductive health and rights. "Even though Kenya outlawed the cut in 2011 and the Maasai people abandoned it in 2014, the law is difficult to enforce, especially in rural communities. Leng’ete’s work is critical to spreading the message about FGM. “We need to reach more political leaders, more elders, more women, more men, more boys, more girls, more circumcisers,” Leng’ete says. “We need to reach more people through community dialogue and working together.”

Leng'ete has been the recipient of numerous awards since 2015 for the work she is doing to stop FGM. Time Magazine named Leng'ete one of the 100 Most Influential People of 2018 for her work with Maasai communities in Kenya to end the practice of FGM.

Awards and recognition
 2015 Inspirational Woman of the Year Award from the Kenyan Ministry of Devolution
 2016 Recipient of a Mandela Washington Fellowship for Young African Leaders.
 2018 Recognized as one of 300 global youth leaders by Women Deliver
 2018 Awarded Annemarie Madison Prize for her commitment to stop FGM.
 2018 Named one of Time Magazine's 100 most influential people in the world
 2018 100 Most Influential Young Kenyans - Avance Media 
 2022 Laureate Freedom from Want Award

References

 

1991 births
Kenyan women's rights activists
Activists against female genital mutilation
Living people
Kenyan feminists
Maasai people
Violence against women in Kenya
Kenyan health activists
People from Kajiado County